Nanping is a prefecture-level city in Fujian, China.

Nanping may also refer to:

Modern locations

Towns
Nanping, Lintao, a town in Lintao County, Gansu, China
Nanping, Guangdong, a town in Xiangzhou District, Zhuhai, Guangdong, China
Nanping, Guangnan County, a town in Guangnan County, Yunnan, China
Nanping, Pu'er City, a town in Simao District, Pu'er City, Yunnan, China

Nanping, Nan'an District, a town in Nan'an District, Chongqing, China
Nanping, Sichuan, a town created in 2013 in Jiuzhaigou County, Sichuan, China
Nanping, Anhui, a town in Suixi County, Anhui, China
Nanping, Jilin, a town in Helong, Jilin, China

Nanping, Nanchuan District, a town in Nanchuan District, Chongqing, China
Nanping, Gong'an County, a town in Gong'an County, Hubei, China

Townships
Nanping Township, Shaanxi, a township in Ningqiang County, Shaanxi, China
Nanping Township, Zhejiang, a township in Tiantai County, Zhejiang, China
Nanping Township, Guangxi, a township in Shangsi County, Guangxi, China
Nanping Township, Hubei, a township in Lichuan, Hubei, China
Nanping Township, Gansu, a township in Zhuanglang County, Gansu, China
Nanping Township, Sichuan, a township in Xuanhan County, Sichuan, China

Subdistricts
 Nanping, Changde (南坪街道), Wuling District, Changde City, Hunan Province

Railway stations
Nanping Station, a Chongqing Rail Transit station in Nanping, Nan'an District, Chongqing, China

Former locations
Jingnan, a 10th-century kingdom during the Five Dynasties and Ten Kingdoms period, also known as Nanping
Yanping District in Nanping City, formerly known as Nanping District
Jiuzhaigou County in Sichuan, China, formerly known as Nanping County